Rich Mullins' first, self-titled, solo album was released in 1986 on Reunion Records.

Track listing

Side one
 "A Few Good Men" (Rich Mullins) – 3:45
 "A Place to Stand" (Rich Mullins) – 4:10
 "Live Right" (Rich Mullins, Wayne Kirkpatrick, Reed Arvin) – 4:43
Features guest vocals by Amy Grant
 "New Heart" (Rich Mullins, Reed Arvin) – 3:10
 "Elijah" (Rich Mullins) – 4:37
New recording appeared on compilation Songs 1996

Side two
 "Nothing but a Miracle" (Rich Mullins)  – 4:06
 "Both Feet on the Ground" (Rich Mullins, Niles Borop) – 3:41
 "These Days" (Rich Mullins, Pam Mark Hall) – 3:41
 "Prisoner" (Rich Mullins) – 3:27
 "Save Me" (Rich Mullins) – 2:50

Personnel 

 Rich Mullins – lead vocals
 Reed Arvin – keyboards, synthesizers, Synclavier
 Phil Naish – keyboards, acoustic piano 
 Greg Jennings – guitars
 Gary Lunn – bass
 Keith Edwards – drums
 Amy Grant – guest vocals (3)
 Billy Crockett – backing vocals 
 Chris Harris – backing vocals 
 Mark Heimermann – backing vocals 
 Chris Rodriguez – backing vocals

Production 

 Reed Arvin – producer
 Michael Blanton – executive producer
 Dan Harrell – executive producer
 Brown Bannister – executive producer
 JB – engineer
 Spencer Chrislu – assistant engineer
 Keith Penny – assistant engineer
 Billy Whittington – assistant engineer
 Doug Sax – mastering, at the Masterting Lab (Hollywood, California)
 Omni Sound (Nashville, Tennessee) – recording location
 Hummingbird Studios (Nashville, Tennessee) – recording location
 Riverstone Studios (Franklin, Tennessee) – recording location
 Kent Hunter – art direction and design at Thomas Ryan Design
 Mark Tucker – photography
 Amy Grant – sleeve notes

Charts

References 

Rich Mullins albums
1986 albums
Albums produced by Reed Arvin